Roops is a surname. Notable people with the surname include:

Siim Roops (born 1986), Estonian footballer
Sirje Roops (born 1992), Estonian footballer